The 2018–19 Pacific Tigers women's basketball team represents the University of the Pacific during the 2018–19 NCAA Division I women's basketball season. The Tigers are led by fourth year head coach Bradley Davis. They play their home games at Alex G. Spanos Center and were members of the West Coast Conference. They finished the season 19–13, 10–8 in WCC play to finish in a tie for fifth place. They advanced to the quarterfinals of the WCC women's tournament where they lost to Pepperdine. They received an at-large bid to the WNIT where defeated Fresno State in the first round before losing to Arizona in the second round.

Roster

Schedule 

|-
!colspan=9 style=| Exhibition

|-
!colspan=9 style=| Non-conference regular season

|-
!colspan=9 style=| WCC regular season

|-
!colspan=9 style=| WCC Women's Tournament

|-
!colspan=9 style=| WNIT

Rankings
2018–19 NCAA Division I women's basketball rankings

See also 
2018–19 Pacific Tigers men's basketball team

References 

Pacific Tigers women's basketball seasons
Pacific
Pacific
Pacific
Pacific